Amina Lemrini El Ouahabi is a Moroccan human rights activist, and the president of Morocco's Haute Autorité de la communication audiovisuelle (Higher Council of Audiovisual Communication).

Early life
Lamrini earned a PhD (doctorat d'État) in educational science.

Career
Lamrini is the co-founder and former president of the Democratic Association of Moroccan Women (Association Démocratique des Femmes Marocaines).

Lamrini is a founding member of the Moroccan Organization for Human Rights (OMDH).

In  May 2012, King Mohammed VI appointed Lamrini as the President of the Higher Council of Audiovisual Communication, at the Royal Palace in Rabat. She succeeded Ahmed Ghazali as the holder of this position, following his sudden dismissal. She has been called a "un choix emblématique" (an iconic choice), and a left-winger committed to human rights and democracy.

Publications
Lamrini has published a pedagogic guidebook on education and children's rights, and has written articles and publications on issues surrounding to women's emancipation including, "L’image de la femme dans le discours scolaire" and "Femmes et développement humain: cas du Maroc".

Personal life
She is the mother of two children.

References

Living people
21st-century Moroccan women politicians
21st-century Moroccan politicians
Year of birth missing (living people)